Muteesa I Royal University (MRU) is a private university in Uganda. It was accredited by the Uganda National Council for Higher Education (UNCHE) in 2007. On 15 June 2016, Justice Julia Sebutinde was installed as Chancellor of the University, replacing Ronald Muwenda Mutebi II, the founding chancellor who became The Visitor of the University.

Muteesa 1 Royal University organised a sports Gala named "Friends of Muteesa 1 Royal University Secondary schools Sports Gala". Sports included were football, netball, and volleyball. Many schools in Greater Masaka participated in the gala from 17 June 2022 to 19 June 2022.

Location
MRU has three campuses.

The coordinates of this campus are 0°19'21.0"S, 31°44'35.0"E (Latitude:-0.322500; Longitude:31.743056).

The second campus is on Mengo Hill, the seat of the Buganda Government, within the city of Kampala. The coordinates of this campus are 0°18'24.0"N, 32°33'19.0"E (Latitude:00 19 21S; Longitude:31 44 33E).

History
MRU was established when ownership of the Masaka Technical Institute (Uganda Technical College, Masaka), was transferred from the government of Uganda to the Buganda government in January 2007.

MRU is named after Muteesa I of Buganda who invited the British to introduce formal education in his kingdom (Buganda) in the late 19th century. MRU received Tertiary Education Institution accreditation from the Ministry of Education & Sports in July 2007. MRU admitted the first class of students in October 2007. MRU held its first graduation ceremony on Friday 15 April, 2011. At the same ceremony, Ronald Muwenda Mutebi was installed as the first chancellor of the university.

MRU has, to date, held seven graduation events with the most recent held in January 2019 with the Vice President of Uganda Edward Kiwanuka Ssekandi as the Guest of Honor.

Academics
As of July 2018, MRU had the following academic faculties:

Operational faculties
 Faculty of Science and Technology 
 Faculty of Social, Cultural and Development Studies
 Faculty of Business Management
 Faculty of Education

Faculty of Education

Planned faculties
 Faculty of Agriculture and Veterinary Studies
 Faculty of Natural Environment, Tourism and Tourism Studies
 Faculty of Medicine, Health Sciences and Health Services

Courses
The following undergraduate degree courses were offered at MRU in September 2014:

Faculty of Business Management

 Bachelor of Business Management
 Bachelor of Public Administration
 Bachelor of Public Relations
 Bachelor of Procurement and Logistics Management
 Bachelor of Commerce
 Bachelor of Science in accounting and finance
 Bachelor of Science in development economics
 Bachelor of Micro Finance Management
 Bachelor of Entrepreneurship and Management
 Bachelor of Business Computing
 Bachelor of Human Resource Management
 Bachelor of Science in project management

Faculty of Science, Information Technology, Art & Design
 Bachelor of Civil Engineering
 Bachelor of Electrical Engineering
 Bachelor of Industrial and Fine Art
 Bachelor of Information Technology
 Bachelor of Library and Information Science
 Bachelor of Science in Computer Science
 Bachelor of Software Engineering

Faculty of Education

 Bachelor of Arts with education
 Bachelor of Education
 Bachelor of Business Education
 Bachelor of Entrepreneurship with education
 Bachelor of Education with art and design
 Bachelor of Primary Education
 Bachelor of Computer Studies with education
 Bachelor of Secondary Education

Faculty of social sciences, arts and humanities 
 Bachelor in Development Studies
 Bachelor in Social Work and Social Administration
 Bachelor of Tourism and Hotel Management
 Bachelor of Arts in mass communication
 Bachelor of Guidance and Counseling

In addition to the academic degree programs listed above, MRU offers diploma and certificate courses in the same or similar fields.

See also
List of universities in Uganda
List of medical schools in Uganda
List of university leaders in Uganda)

References

http://www.buganda.or.ug/index.php/news/430-1235-students-graduate-at-muteesa-1-royal-university

https://www.independent.co.ug/muteesa-i-royal-university-asked-to-focus-on-agricultural-innovations/

https://www.bukedde.co.ug/bukedde/amawulire/1501794/obwakabaka-bulonze-omumyuka-wa-cansala-wa-muteesa-yunivasite

https://www.monitor.co.ug/News/National/Prof-Ddumba-oversee-Muteesa-I-University-academic/688334-4673046-a0eve5/index.html

External links
Website of Muteesa I Royal University
"Infighting stifles growth of Muteesa varsity"

Universities and colleges in Uganda
Educational institutions established in 2007
Masaka
Masaka District
Central Region, Uganda
2007 establishments in Uganda